Iraj Bashiri (born July 31, 1940) is professor of history at the University of Minnesota, United States, and one of the leading scholars in the fields of Central Asian studies and Iranian Studies. Fluent in English, Persian, Tajik, and several Turkic languages, Bashiri has been able to study and translate works otherwise inaccessible to the mostly Russian-speaking Central Asian studies community. Bashiri career focus started on Iran, and engaged also with Central Asia, notably the Tajik identity and the relations between Tajiks and the Turkic people of Central Asia, namely the Uzbeks.

Biography 
Iraj Bashiri was born on July 31, 1940, in Behbahan, Iran. He completed his early education in the towns of Damaneh and Daran in Fereydan and his high school in Isfahan and Shiraz.

He graduated in 1961 with a diploma in mathematics from Haj Qavam High School in Shiraz. While in high school, Bashiri showed a distinct talent for the English language. In 1959, he emerged from the national competitions held at Ramsar as Iran's top student in English.  Between 1960 and 1963, Bashiri studied English Language and Literature at Pahlavi University (present-day Shiraz University) and in 1963 graduated at the top of his class. While studying at Pahlavi, he also worked as a regional reporter for the Kayhan Daily in the Fars province and taught English at the British Council in Shiraz and English literature at Pahlavi University.

In 1964, Bashiri left Iran to study English Literature in the United Kingdom and, in 1966, he traveled to the United States to continue his education. In 1968, he received his M.A. degree in General Linguistics from the University of Michigan and, in 1972, his Ph.D. in Iranian Linguistics from the same university. Bashiri's dissertation is based on Ibn Sina's concept of Existence (budan). He shows that the Persian verb budan (to be) has its own syntax. This syntax in the context of the concept of Becoming (shodan) expresses transition, and in the context of Doing (kardan) expresses action.

In the United States, too, in addition to studying linguistics, Bashiri taught Persian at the University of Michigan and trained Peace Corps volunteers in Vermont, New York, and New Jersey. In 1972, he was employed as a Visiting Assistant Professor of Iranian and Turkish Languages and Literatures at the University of Minnesota. During his early years at Minnesota, he used the theoretical framework that he had developed in his dissertation as the base for writing Persian for Beginners. This book, which has been revised four times, is available in both English and Russian languages. Bashiri was promoted to Associate Professor in 1977 and to Professor in 1996.

Bashiri is currently a professor of history at the University of Minnesota. Professor Bashiri's courses at Minnesota include Iranian history (from ancient to modern times), Persian Literature (poetry and prose), and Iranian Languages and Linguistics. He also has developed and taught courses on the history of the peoples of Central Asia and Afghanistan. In 1980, he was recognized as one of the College of Liberal Arts' Distinguished Teachers.

Bashiri has traveled extensively in Iran and Central Asia, including stints as a visiting scholar in Kazakhstan, Kyrgyzstan and Tajikistan. Bashiri has also worked closely with the Tajik division of Radio Free Europe/Radio Liberty.

While teaching at the University of Minnesota, Bashiri also taught and carried out research at other universities including the University of Michigan, the University of Texas at Austin, the State University of Kyrgyzstan, and the Academy of Sciences of Kazakhstan.

Finally, while carrying out research and teaching, Prof. Bashiri has also been involved in the administration of his home University. Between 1975 and 1979, he was the head of the Middle East Studies Department and later the South Asian Studies Department at the University of Minnesota. Several times between 1987 and 2005, he was the Chair of, first, the Russian and East European Studies, and later the Slavic and Central Asian Languages and Literatures. He also has been active in College committees, especially in relation to curricula. In 2005, he was both the Head of the College of Liberal Arts Assembly and the Head of the Executive Council of the college. Currently, he is the Interim Director of the Institute of Linguistics, English as a Second Language and Slavic Languages and Literatures.

Bashiri is married to Carol L. Sayers and together they have three children and five grandchildren. His hobbies include writing realist fiction, fishing, and painting Central Asian and Iranian rural life.

Partial list of published works 

Books:
 Persian for Beginners, 1972, 1975, 1981, 1991.
 Persidskij yazyk dla nachinaushchikh Osnovnoj kurs (trans., Persian for Beginners by V. Bazukin), 2000.
 'To Be' as the Origin of Syntax: A Persian Framework, 1973.
 The Fiction of Sadeq Hedayat, 1984.
 The Black Tulip (novella in English and Persian), 1984.
 The Pearl Cannon (ed.), 1986.
 Firdowsi's Shahname: 1000 Years After, 1994.
 From the Hymns of Zarathustra to the Songs of Borbad, 2003.
 Kamal Khujandi: Epoch and Its Importance in the History of Central Asian Civilization, 1996.
 The History of a National Catastrophe, by Rahim Masov (trans.), 1996.
 The Samanids and the Revival of the Civilization of the Iranian Peoples, 1998.
 Tajikistan in the 20th Century,(ed). RFE/RL, 1999–2002.
 Beginnings to AD 2000: A Comprehensive Chronology of Central Asia, Afghanistan, and Iran, 2001.
 Prominent Tajik Figures of the Twentieth Century, 2003.
 The Nowruz Scrolls, published in 4 languages (novella in English, Persian, Tajiki, Russian), 2004.
 The Impact of Egypt on Ancient Iran, 2007.
 The Ishraqi Philosophy of Jalal al-Din Rumi, 2008.
 Ancient Iran: Cosmology, Mythology, History by Iraj Bashiri, Cognella Publishers, 2012.
 Audible Audio Edition: Ancient Iran: Cosmology, Mythology, History by Iraj Bashiri, Cognella Publishers, 2013.
 The Blind Owl,, 3rd. revised translation, 2013.
 Modern Iranian Philosophy: From Ibn Sina to Mulla Sadra Shirazi by Iraj Bashiri, Cognella Publishers, 2014.

External links 
 Bashiri working papers on Central Asia and Iran
 Iraj Bashiri biography
 Prominent Tajik Figures of the Twentieth Century
 Works available by Iraj Bashiri at Amazon.com

20th-century Iranian historians
Iranian expatriate academics
Iranian emigrants to the United States
Central Asian studies scholars
People from Behbahan
1940 births
Living people
University of Michigan College of Literature, Science, and the Arts alumni
Members of the Tajik Academy of Sciences
American writers of Iranian descent
21st-century American historians
21st-century American male writers
American male non-fiction writers